Guardians is a fantasy-themed collectible card game (CCG) published by Friedlander Publishing Group (FPG) in 1995.

Description

Components
 initial starter deck of 60 cards
 booster packs of 14 cards each

Gameplay
Like other CCGs, each player assembles a 55-card deck from the starter deck and booster packs; it must include at least one Guardian and three Strongholds. Other types of cards needed include Terrains, Shields, Magic Items, Bribes (Beer and Babe cards), and Creatures. Unlike other CCGs, Guardian also features a rectangular battlefield with a 4 x 3 grid placed between the players. Each player places their three Stronghold cards in the row closest to them. The two rows that lie in between are a no man's land called the "disputed territories."

Victory conditions
A player wins by fulfilling any one of three victory conditions:
 The player defeats the enemy Guardian.
 The player conquers all 6 squares of "disputed territories".
 The player destroys five enemy Shields.

Publication history
Guardians was designed by Keith Parkinson and Luke Peterschmidt, with initial artwork by Parkinson, Brom, Don Maitz, Mike Ploog, and James Wahorla. It was published by Friedlander Publishing Group (FPG) in 1995.

Artwork
As new booster packs were released, the list of contributing artists grew to include:
 Chris Achilleos
 Denis Beauvais
 Timothy Bradstreet
 Larry Elmore
 Wilson Keith Elmore
 Richard Hescox
 Ken Kelly
 Rowena Morrill
 Mark Poole
 Shaw
 Darrell K. Sweet

Marketing
Artwork and marketing sometimes featured scantily clad women and used suggestive sexual themes, especially the class of cards called "Babes."  In an article/advertisement by designer Luke Peterschmidt in Inquest, an illustration of three buxom women has the caption "Six of the...  uh, three of the best things about Guardians."

Expansion set list
 Guardians Revised Edition
 Dagger Isle (120 cards)
 Drifter's Nexus (120 cards) 
 Necropolis Park 

The Dagger Isle expansion set, consisting of 120 cards, was released in mid-1996 and sold in 14-card booster packs. The 120-card expansion set Drifter's Nexus was released in April 1996 and sold in 8-card booster packs.

Reception
In the April 1996 edition of Dragon (Issue 228), Rick Swan called Guardians "an impressive little weirdo," but warned that the "Babe" cards were "the most blatant display of sexism the industry's seen." He called the combat system "the game's best feature," and complimented its "several ingenious twists." Swan concluded by giving the game an average rating of 4 out of 6, saying, "Guardians is not without its problems. For a premise this goofy [...] it's way too complicated [...] Still, the plusses outweigh the minuses, making it a must for collectible card freaks with an eye for good art."
 
In the September 1996 issue of The Duelist (Issue 12), Allen Varney reported that the game had a strong following in Philadelphia, Ohio, England and France.

In a review in the September 1996 issue of InQuest, Jason Schneiderman stated that the expansion set Drifter's Nexus is "an all-out comedy".

References

Further reading

External links
Chez Phil, Fan de Guardians - Set information and ruling summaries, card database, background information on  cards and other collectible items, storyline information, Seven Seas: an unofficial set cards...

Guardians CCG - A blog detailing Guardians Solo Adventures, which is a single-player adventure-type rules variant, and including new user-generated cards specifically made for this variant.
C. J. Burke's Guardians page - Guardians rules and trivia
Preview in Scrye #8

Card games introduced in 1995
Collectible card games